Mount Hallen is a rural locality in the Somerset Region, Queensland, Australia.

History 
The former railway station in the area was originally called Buaraba in 1866 but was called Mount Hallen after the mountain from 1886 to 1941. The mountain was named in 1829 by explorer Allan Cunningham, probably after Ambrose Hallen, who was the Assistant Surveyor-General in New South Wales from 1827 to 1829. The locality takes its name from the railway station name.

References 

Suburbs of Somerset Region
Localities in Queensland